Pomfret is a group of perciform fishes which includes about 20 species and belongs to the family Bramidae.

Pomfret may also refer to:

People
 Pomfret (surname), a surname
 Earl of Pomfret, formerly a title in the Peerage of Great Britain

Places
 Pontefract, West Yorkshire, still known locally as Pomfret, a name going back to Norman times
 Pomfret Castle or Pontefract Castle, prison of Richard II, now a ruin
 Pomfret Stakes, a horse race run at Pontefract
 Pontefract cake or Pomfret cakes, a small, roughly circular black sweet, made of liquorice

United States
 Pomfret, Connecticut
 Pomfret School, Connecticut
 Pomfret Street Historic District
 Pomfret Town House, an historic meetinghouse
 Pomfret, Maryland
 Pomfret, New York
 Pomfret, Vermont
 North Pomfret, Vermont

Elsewhere
 Pomfret, North West, South Africa
 Pomfret, a fictional county town in the Inspector Wexford series of books

Other uses
 Pomfret Manor Cemetery, Sunbury, Pennsylvania
 Pomfret Plantation, Marion, Maryland
 USS Pomfret (SS-391), a World War II submarine

See also
 Pumphrey (disambiguation)
 Pommes frites (British English: chips; American English: French fries), potatoes cut into strips and deep fried